The Spencer W. Kimball Tower, also known as the  Kimball Tower or KMBL (formerly SWKT ), is a 12-story building that houses classrooms and administrative offices on the Brigham Young University campus in Provo, Utah.

Honorary name
The building is named after Spencer W. Kimball, the twelfth president of the Church of Jesus Christ of Latter-day Saints. During the summer of 2018, and upon request from the Kimball family, its nickname was changed from the SWKT to KMBL.

Design
It was the tallest building in Provo, Utah until the completion of the Provo Fourth District Courthouse in 2018 and the Pedersen Patient Tower of Utah Valley Regional Medical Center in 2019, the latter currently being the tallest building in Provo. To offset a corridor effect, the building was positioned at a 45-degree angle to nearby buildings.

Tenants
The building houses Brigham Young University's College of Family, Home and Social Sciences and College of Nursing and their various subsidiary departments and programs.

See also
 Brigham Young University
 College of Family, Home and Social Sciences
 List of Brigham Young University buildings

References

Personal correspondence between BYU and Mary Kimball Dollahite

External links
 Interactive map of Brigham Young University

University and college academic buildings in the United States
University and college administration buildings in the United States
Skyscrapers in Utah
University and college buildings completed in 1981
Brigham Young University buildings
1981 establishments in Utah